Rapparees Starlights GAA is a Gaelic Athletic Association club located in Enniscorthy, County Wexford, Ireland. The club fields teams in hurling as Rapparees and in Gaelic football as Starlights.

History

The Rapparees Starlights club was founded in 1972, following an amalgamation between the existing St Aidan's and Shamrocks hurling clubs and the Starlights and Emmetts Gaelic football clubs.
On 19 September 2021, they won their first Wexford senior hurling title since 1978 with a 6-18 to 1-17 win against St Anne's.

Honours

 Wexford Senior Football Championship (5): 1983, 2002, 2004, 2017, 2020
As Starlights (6): 1927, 1828, 1929, 1933, 1936, 1937
As Rapparees (5): 1907, 1908, 1909, 1912, 1913
 Wexford Senior Hurling Championship: (2) 1978, 2021

Notable players

 Adrian Fenlon
 Kevin Foley
 Christy Keogh
 Declan Ruth
 Liam Ryan
 Phil Wilson
 Paul Lynch
 Podge Courtney

References

External links
Rapparees Starlights GAA site

Gaelic games clubs in County Wexford
Hurling clubs in County Wexford
Gaelic football clubs in County Wexford